Tiliqua scincoides (common blue-tongued skink, blue-tongued lizard, common bluetongue) is a species of skink. It is native to Australia as well Tanimbar Island (Maluku Province, Indonesia).

Subspecies
There are three subspecies:
Tiliqua scincoides scincoides – eastern blue-tongued skink (southern/eastern Australia)
Tiliqua scincoides intermedia – northern blue-tongued skink (northern Australia)
Tiliqua scincoides chimaera – Tanimbar blue-tongued skink (Maluku Province, Indonesia)

Description 
This is a large species of terrestrial blue tongue measuring upwards of 60 centimetres in length and over 1 kilogram in mass. It has a stout body and short legs. It is variable in color but generally has a banded pattern. The tongue is blue-violet to cobalt blue in color. The tongue is used, like most animals in the order Squamata, to collect micro molecules to deliver to sensory organs as a "smell" sense using the tip. The tongue of the blue-tongued skink is also useful in catching prey, as it is coated in a sticky mucus to preserve surface tension in motion to draw an insect back into the mouth. Due to its characteristic blue tongue and its curious nature, it is a popular companion animal in Western countries.

This lizard is diurnal, active during the day. It is omnivorous, feeding on insects, snails, frogs, other reptiles, small birds, small mammals, carrion, some plant material, fruits, and other vegetation. It is ovoviviparous, and a live bearing reptile. The female's litter can have a range from 5 to 25 live young per litter with Tiliqua scincoides scincoides being known to carry the largest litters. This species is known to live over 30 years. It is an adaptable animal, often finding habitat in urban and suburban areas, including residential areas of Sydney. The lizard is considered beneficial in these areas, with its appetite for garden pests such as slugs and snails. 

When threatened it may hiss and reveal its blue tongue, startling potential predators.

There are many localities and established color variations for each. Eastern blue tongues can have a green or yellow phase, they can have eye bands or not, and look different coming from the Brisbane area and others. In captivity, breeders have expressed albinism and hyper melanism. Northerns are either classic/standard looking or speckled from the Kimberly region and Prince Regent National Park. In captivity, breeders have expressed exaggerated colorations that can be red, yellow, orange, caramel, white, and others. Tanimbar blue tongues are the most glossy and often seen in a gold or silver phase. Tanimbar and Kimberly Northerns are known for being more aggressive in the wild than other species. All blue tongue species display greater tolerance for human interaction the more generations they are bred in captivity.

Gallery

References

Tiliqua
Skinks of Australia
Reptiles of Indonesia
Reptiles described in 1790
Taxa named by John White (surgeon)
Reptiles as pets